Norden is a suburban village in the Metropolitan Borough of Rochdale, in Greater Manchester, England. Historically part of Lancashire, the village is situated on the western outskirts of Rochdale. There is a Rochdale Ward with the same name. At the 2011 Census, this ward had a population of 9,766.

As a result of changes to boundaries, Norden ward is divided between the Heywood and Middleton and Rochdale constituencies, represented in Parliament by Chris Clarkson (of the Conservative Party) and Tony Lloyd (of the Labour Party).

The main road through the village is the A680 Edenfield Road, which runs from Rochdale town centre to the village of Edenfield within the Rossendale borough of Lancashire.

Norden is the home of Norden Cricket Club, who play in the Central Lancashire League.

Taylor Park is an outlying area of Norden.

References

External links

Villages in Greater Manchester
Areas of the Metropolitan Borough of Rochdale